Holly Cole Collection Vol.1 is a compilation album by Holly Cole. Originally released in Canada in 2004 on Alert Records, it was also released internationally in 2004 on Magada Records.

Track listing

 "I Can See Clearly Now" (Johnny Nash) – 4:14
 "Trust in Me" (Sherman/Sherman) – 4:39
 "Jersey Girl" (Tom Waits) – 3:46
 "Calling You" (Telson) – 4:38
 "Too Darn Hot" (Porter) – 3:13
 "Come Fly with Me" (Sammy Cahn, Jimmy Van Heusen) – 3:56
 "Girl Talk" (HEFTI/Troup) – 4:34
 "The Question of U" (Prince) – 3:41
 "Make It Go Away" (Harding/Davis) – 3:56
 "Shiver Me Timbers" (Tom Waits) – 4:35
 "Hum Drum Blues" (Brown) – 5:36
 "God Only Knows" (Brian Wilson, Tony Asher) – 4:28
 "Fragile" (with Jesse Cook) (Sting) – 4:00
 "My Foolish Heart" (Ned Washington, Victor Young) – 4:36

References

Holly Cole albums
2004 compilation albums